NSN may refer to:
 National Security Network, a non-profit foreign-policy organization headquartered in Washington, D.C.
 NATO Stock Number, a code used to identify NATO military supply equipment
 Nelson Airport (New Zealand), by IATA code
 Network Service Name - for accessing a database in Oracle Net Services
 New Schools Network, a UK-based education reform group
 Nokia Solutions and Networks, a wholly owned subsidiary of Nokia Corporation
 North Shore Navigators, a wooden-bat, collegiate summer baseball team based in Lynn, Massachusetts
 Never Shout Never, an American indie rock band
Native Sovereign Nation eg. .nsn.us third level TLD
 National Socialist Network, an Australian neo-Nazi organisation founded in 2020

See also 
 Never Say Never (disambiguation)